New Long Pond is a  pond in the Myles Standish State Forest in Plymouth, Massachusetts. The pond is located northeast of East Head Reservoir and southwest of College Pond and Three Cornered Pond. The water quality is impaired due to non-native aquatic plants.

External links
Environmental Protection Agency

Ponds of Plymouth, Massachusetts
Ponds of Massachusetts